Vadakku Bommaiyapuram is a small village nearby to Pasuvanthanai in Ottapidaram Taluk in Tuticorin District, South India. This small village has around 100+ small families mainly of Naicker community also called as Kamma Naidu community.

Agriculture is the only employment source in the village. Local farmers grow paddy, maize, chillies, cotton, plantains, etc. and pulses like black gram, bengal gram, and green gram.

Villages in Thoothukudi district